Dicerca callosa is a species of metallic wood-boring beetle in the family Buprestidae. It is found in North America.

Subspecies
These two subspecies belong to the species Dicerca callosa:
 Dicerca callosa callosa Casey, 1909
 Dicerca callosa frosti Nelson, 1963

References

Further reading

 
 
 

Buprestidae
Beetles of North America
Beetles described in 1909
Taxa named by Thomas Lincoln Casey Jr.
Articles created by Qbugbot